National Road 68, is a Swedish national road between Örebro in Örebro Municipality and Gävle in Gävle Municipality. The length of the road is 230 km. The road is important for long-distance driving, and is part of the most used route between Gothenburg and the coast of northern Sweden.

National road 68